James Havens Homestead is a historic home located at Shelter Island in Suffolk County, New York. The house was built in 1743 and expanded in the early- mid-19th century.  It is a large wood-frame building with wood-shingle sheathing, broad gable roof, wraparound porch, and rear wings.  The main section includes a two-story, three-bay side-entrance-hall dwelling which was enlarged to four bays with a wide two-story, one-bay addition.  Also on the property is a small wood-frame shed.

It was added to the National Register of Historic Places in 1986.

The house is owned by the Shelter Island Historical Society and operated as a historic house museum.

References

External links
 Shelter Island Historical Society

Houses on the National Register of Historic Places in New York (state)
Houses completed in 1743
Houses in Suffolk County, New York
Museums in Suffolk County, New York
Historic house museums in New York (state)
National Register of Historic Places in Suffolk County, New York
1743 establishments in the Thirteen Colonies